Ockbrook and Borrowash is a civil parish in the Borough of Erewash, Derbyshire, England.   The parish contains 36 listed buildings that are recorded in the National Heritage List for England.  Of these, three are listed at Grade II*, the middle of the three grades, and the others are at Grade II, the lowest grade.  The parish contains the villages of Ockbrook and Borrowash and the surrounding area.  From the middle of the 18th century a Moravian settlement was established in Ockbrook, and a number of buildings associated with it are listed, including the chapel, the manse, a school and houses in The Settlement.  Most of the other listed buildings are houses, farmhouses and associated structures, and the rest include a church and associated structures, a canal bridge, and two war memorials.


Key

Buildings

References

Citations

Sources

 

Lists of listed buildings in Derbyshire